Birch Gibson (1828 - September 10, 1895) was a state legislator and local official in Ocala, Florida. He was one of several African Americans to represent Marion County, Florida in the Florida House of Representatives during the Reconstruction era in 1872. He was elected in 1873. He served as on the Ocala City Council, in the state House, and as a justice of the peace.

He was born in Alabama.

See also
African-American officeholders during and following the Reconstruction era

References

Members of the Florida House of Representatives
People from Alabama
People from Ocala, Florida
1828 births
1895 deaths